Smith Estate, also known as Longwood Estate - Smith House, is a historic estate located at Ridge in Suffolk County, New York. It is preserved and maintained by the Town of Brookhaven. The Longwood Estate is part of a huge parcel of land originally purchased by William "Tangier" Smith in the 17th century, which he called Manor St. George. The estate consists of a large, late 18th century main house (altered and enlarged during the 19th century), caretaker's cottage, a farm complex (of barns and sheds dating from the late 18th through early 20th centuries), the Smith family cemetery, and a small frame schoolhouse moved to the property in 1977.

It was added to the National Register of Historic Places in 1981.

References

External links
Bygone Long Island ---- Historical ---- The Longwood Estate aka St George's Manor

Houses on the National Register of Historic Places in New York (state)
Gothic Revival architecture in New York (state)
Colonial Revival architecture in New York (state)
Houses completed in 1790
Houses in Suffolk County, New York
Brookhaven, New York
National Register of Historic Places in Suffolk County, New York